The 1993 Singaporean presidential election was held to elect the next president of Singapore. Two eligible candidates were issued certificates of eligibility by the Presidential Elections Committee, and both were nominated on Nomination Day with Ong Teng Cheong defeated Chua Kim Yeow due to a popular vote.

Background

Constitution Amendments
In January 1991, the Constitution of Singapore was amended to provide for the popular election of the President. The creation of the elected presidency was a major constitutional and political change in Singapore's history as, under the revision, the president is empowered to veto the use of government reserves and appointments to key Civil Service appointments. He or she can also examine the administration's enforcement of the Internal Security Act and Maintenance of Religious Harmony Act, and look into investigations of corruption.

By virtue of transitional provisions in the Constitution of Singapore, Ong's predecessor Wee Kim Wee exercised, performed and discharged all the functions, powers and duties of an elected president as if he had been elected to the office of President by the citizens of Singapore.

Polling day was on 28 August 1993. The writ of election was issued on 4 August 1993, with the Nomination Day and Polling Day adjourned on 18 and 28 August 1993, respectively.

Candidates

Eligible

Declared Ineligible

Declined

Nomination Day
Candidates needed to obtain a Certificate of Eligibility from the Presidential Elections Committee, and pay an election deposit of S$18,000, three times that of a Parliamentary candidate, in order to file their nomination papers. Ong had earlier resigned as Deputy Prime Minister, MP for Toa Payoh GRC, and party member of the People's Action Party (PAPG in order to contest in the election. Ong was backed by influential leaders such as Prime Minister Goh Chok Tong and Senior Minister Lee Kuan Yew.

However, some members of the Cabinet and the PAP supported Chua, including Minister for Finance Richard Hu and Chairman and CEO of OCBC Bank Tony Tan. Workers' Party members J. B. Jeyaretnam and Tan Soo Phuan also applied for nomination, but were not awarded the Certificate of Eligibility.

Chua's Campaign
Chua was a reluctant candidate and had to be persuaded by the Singapore Government to stand in, so that the election would not be an uncontested walkover, and at the same time, the electorate could choose between two good candidates.

The 10-day campaign was supposed to be a "gentlemen's election", free of flag-waving and noisy rallies. However, Chua took it to the extreme, urging supporters not to campaign for him. He appeared on TV only twice—once avoiding any mention of himself or his views, and even announced on polling day that Ong was the better candidate. Even so, Chua did surprisingly well, garnering 41.3% of the vote.

Results
Polls were closed and votes were counted with Ong Teng Cheong winning 58.69% of the votes. Returning Officer Ong Kok Min declared Ong Teng Cheong as Singapore's first president-elect and was sworn in as the fifth president of Singapore on 1 September 1993.

References

External links
 Government Gazette on Presidential Elections Committee Elections Department - Singapore
  Singapore Window - Singapore

Presidential elections in Singapore
Singapore
Presidential election